Science and Technology Centre (or Science and Technology Center) may refer to:
Asia Pacific Network of Science and Technology Centres, Canberra, Australia
Ghana Space Science and Technology Centre, Ghana
Laser Science and Technology Centre, Delhi, India
International Science and Technology Center, Moscow, Russia
National Space Science and Technology Center, Huntsville, Alabama, United States
Questacon – the National Science and Technology Centre, Canberra, Australia
Science and Technology Center in Ukraine, Kiev, Ukraine
Science and Technology Centre, Whiteknights Campus of Reading University
United States Army Foreign Science and Technology Center, Charlottesville, Virginia, United States